Garima Panta (गरिमा पन्त) is a Nepalese actress who became popular with her movie Jhola which portrays the sati system in Nepal. She also has featured as character Indra in the 2016 movie Teen Ghumti. Teen Ghumti is the film adaption of the popular novel Teen Ghumti/Tin Ghumti by popular Nepali politician and a prolific writer BP Koirala.

Garima Panta married Hari Sharma Thapaliya on an unspecified date in January 2016  but has publicly released the marriage photos in Facebook on May 13, 2016. She had announced the marriage budget, Rs. 700,000, to create a scholarship fund in a couple of schools in her birthplace.

Filmography
Jhola
Preeti Ko Phool   
Thuli
Samjhana
Teen Ghumti
 Arjun Dev
 Jiven mitru
 Man le Man lai Chuncha 
 Sundar mero naam
 Phool
 Schout 
 Bhai halcha ni 
 Rang Baijani
 Dobato (special appearance)
 Sindoor (telefilm)
 Nikhil Dai
 Bhagya Vidhaata

References 

 

Nepalese film actresses
Living people
Year of birth missing (living people)
People from Tanahun District
21st-century Nepalese actresses
Nepalese television actresses
Actresses in Nepali cinema
Actresses in Nepali television